The Communist Party of Burma (CPB), also known as the Burma Communist Party (BCP), is a clandestine communist party in Myanmar (Burma). It is the oldest existing political party in the country.

Founded in 1939, the CPB initially fought against British colonial forces before joining them in a temporary alliance to expel the invading Imperial Japanese Army from Myanmar during World War II. In the final years of the war, the CPB helped establish a leftist political and military coalition called the Anti-Fascist People's Freedom League (AFPFL).

However, the CPB fell out of favour with the more moderate socialists within the AFPFL due to differing views on how an independent Myanmar should be governed. The moderate faction of the AFPFL became the dominant political force in Myanmar's government following the country's independence in 1948. The CPB was subsequently expelled from the AFPFL and the government cracked down on the party's political activities, prompting the CPB's leadership to flee from the capital Rangoon (present-day Yangon). The CPB then began a four-decade-long insurgency in the countryside, which started with an armed insurrection in Paukkongyi, Pegu Region (present-day Bago Region), and ended with an internal mutiny and the party's leadership fleeing to China.

Following the 2021 Myanmar coup d'état, the CPB's cadres rearmed themselves and reentered Myanmar. The CPB subsequently announced that it had begun a "people's war" against the State Administration Council, the military junta established after the coup.

Leadership

Historical 
 Chairpersons
 Thakin Than Tun
 Thakin Zin
 Thakin Ba Thein Tin

 Secretaries-General
 Thakin Aung San
 Thakin Soe
 Thakin Thein Pe (Thein Pe Myint)
 Yèbaw Htay
 Yèbaw Kyin Maung

History

Founding 

The CPB was established in a secret meeting attended by seven men in a small room in Barr Street, Rangoon, on 15 August 1939. The attendees were Thakin Aung San, Thakin Ba Hein, Thakin Bo, Thakin Hla Pe (Bo Let Ya), Thakin Soe, Yèbaw Ba Tin (H. N. Goshal), and Yèbaw Tun Maung (Amar Nag). An armed wing was formed shortly afterwards which fought against British colonial rule and then the invading Imperial Japanese Army upon the start of the Burma campaign of World War II.

World War II (1941–1945) 
While in Insein Prison in July 1941, Thakin Soe and Thakin Than Tun coauthored the Insein Manifesto, which declared fascism "the major enemy in the coming war" and called for temporary cooperation with the British and the establishment of a broad alliance that would include the Soviet Union. It followed the popular front line advocated by Bulgarian communist leader Georgi Dimitrov at the seventh congress of the Comintern in 1935.

This was against the prevailing opinion of the nationalist We Burmans Association ( or the "Thakins"), including Aung San, who had secretly left Burma in 1940 with a group of young intellectuals, later known as the Thirty Comrades, to receive military training from the Japanese. Aung San and the Thirty Comrades returned to Burma in 1941 and established the Burma Independence Army (BIA) to fight against the Allies. After capturing Rangoon in 1942, the Japanese established a puppet state, the State of Burma, and later installed Aung San as its Deputy Prime Minister in August 1943. The BIA was reorganised as the puppet state's armed forces, the Burma National Army (BNA).

Thakin Soe had gone underground in the Irrawaddy Delta to organise armed resistance soon after the invasion, and Thakin Than Tun as Minister of Land and Agriculture was able to pass on intelligence to Thakin Soe. Thakin Thein Pe and Tin Shwe made contact in July 1942 with the exiled colonial government in Simla, India. In January 1944 at a secret meeting near Dedaye in the Delta, the CPB successfully held its first congress chaired by Thakin Soe.

Aung San became increasingly sceptical of Japan's ability to win the war as time progressed, and in mid-1944 he decided to switch sides, reaching out to his former comrades in the CPB. The CPB, together with the BNA and the People's Revolutionary Party (PSP) formed the Anti-Fascist Organisation (AFO) at a secret meeting in Pegu in August 1944. The AFO was later renamed the Anti-Fascist People's Freedom League (AFPFL) on 3 March 1945. Five days later on 8 March 1945, the communist commander Ba Htoo of the northwest command based in Mandalay started a rebellion against the Japanese. The rebellion escalated into a national uprising on 27 March 1945, led by the BNA under the command of Aung San. Japanese forces capitulated by July 1945, and the AFPFL became Burma's most influential political party in the post-war years leading up to independence and for several years after independence was achieved.

Post-World War II developments (1945–1948) 
Thakin Soe and Ba Tin travelled to India in September 1945 to talk to the Communist Party of India, and Thakin Soe came back convinced that armed struggle was the only way forward. Amidst widespread strikes starting with the Rangoon Police and mass rallies, the new British governor Hubert Rance offered Aung San and the others seats in the Executive Council. Aung San initially refused the offer but eventually accepted it in September 1946.

In February 1946 Thakin Soe denounced the CPB's leadership, particularly Thakin Thein Pe, accusing them of Browderism, the form of revisionism espoused by Earl Browder, leader of the American Communist Party. Browder argued that armed revolution would no longer be necessary to establish a dictatorship of the proletariat, as world fascism and imperialism had been weakened, making constitutional methods a real option to achieve "national liberation". Thakin Thein Pe, who had replaced Thakin Soe as secretary general, was the leader responsible for the policy paper on strategy entitled Toward Better Mutual Understanding and Greater Cooperation written in India and adopted at the party's second congress at Bagaya Road, Rangoon in July 1945. Thakin Soe broke away from the CPB to form a splinter group called the Communist Party (Burma) or CP(B) for short. The CP(B) was popularly nicknamed the "red flag communists" as they continued to use the CPB's original red-coloured flag. The majority remained with Thakin Than Tun and Thakin Thein Pe and continued to cooperate with the AFPFL; they were nicknamed the "Thein-Than communists" by the Rangoon press and were popularly known as the "white flag communists" for their use of new white-coloured party flags. During negotiations the British noticed that Thakin Than Tun was the thinker behind Aung San, as Aung San often referred to his brother-in-law for his opinion.

The CPB had abandoned its Browderist line by mid-1946, and a rift that had opened up between the party and Aung San with the socialists culminated in Thakin Than Tun being forced to resign as general secretary of the AFPFL in July, a position he had held since the AFPFL's inception. The CPB was finally expelled from the AFPFL on 2 November 1946 after the communists accused Aung San and the socialists of "kneeling before imperialism", selling out by joining the Executive Council, and calling off the general strike. In the end the CPB failed to achieve "leftist unity" with Aung San and the socialists led by U Nu and Kyaw Nyein within the AFPFL.

In February 1947, Ba Thein Tin and communist student leader Aung Gyi attended the British Empire Conference of Communist Parties in London, the first time the CPB took part in an international communist forum. After denouncing the elections to the Constituent Assembly that took place the following April, the party fielded 25 junior candidates but won just 7 seats. The assassination of Aung San and his cabinet members on 19 July stunned the CPB as much as the rest of the country, but the party was still anxious to build a united front with the AFPFL to drive the British out of Burma, convinced that the assassination was an imperialist plot to stop Aung San from achieving leftist unity.

U Nu concluded negotiations that Aung San had started with the British premier Clement Attlee in London, and the Nu-Attlee Treaty of October 1947 was condemned as a sham by the communists, the bone of contention in particular being the Let Ya-Freeman Defence Agreement, appended as an annexe to the treaty. It provided for an initial period of three years for a British military training mission to remain in the country and a possible future military alliance with Britain. This was to the CPB proof of British intention to subvert Burma's sovereignty and U Nu's capitulation.

U Nu called for a new coalition between communists and socialists on 8 November 1947, urging negotiations between the CPB, the PSP, and the People's Volunteer Organisation (PVO), an association of World War II veterans which served as Aung San's private army. When the attempted coalition failed, U Nu accused the communists of gathering arms for an insurrection. The impact of communist campaigning against the treaty left its mark in Burma's decision not to join the British Commonwealth. Yèbaw Ba Tin, the CPB's Burma-born Bengali theoretician, released a thesis in December 1947 titled, On the Present Political Situation and Our Tasks which set out a revolutionary strategy reviving the slogan "final seizure of power" from the previous January, and called for a "national rising to tear up the treaty of slavery", nationalisation of all British and foreign assets, the abolition of all forms of landlordism and debt, the dismantling of the state bureaucracy and its replacement with a people's government, and alliances and trade agreements with "democratic China, fighting Vietnam and Indonesia" and other democratic countries resisting "Anglo-American imperialist domination". A twofold strategy would be followed: an escalating campaign of strikes by workers and government employees in Rangoon and other cities, and the establishment of "liberated" areas in the countryside to be defended by Red Guards consisting of PVOs trained in guerrilla warfare.

February 1948 saw a wave of strikes in Rangoon by the All Burma Trade Union Congress (ABTUC) backed by the CPB, and in March 1948 a 75,000-strong mass rally by the All Burma Peasants Organisation (ABPO) took place in Pyinmana. U Nu ordered the arrest of the CPB's leaders, convinced that they were planning an uprising on Resistance Day, 27 March, only to find the CPB headquarters at Bagaya empty on the morning of. The party leadership had flown to their stronghold in Pyinmana to start an armed revolution.

Insurgency against the AFPFL (1948–1962) 

The CPB fired the first shots of their post-independence insurgency in Paukkongyi, Pegu Region, on 2 April 1948. Thakin Soe's red flag communists had already started a rebellion, as had the Arakanese nationalists led by the veteran monk U Seinda and the Muslim mujahideen in Arakan. The PVO had split into "white-band" and "yellow-band" factions; the majority white-band PVO led by Bo La Yaung (a member of the Thirty Comrades) and Bo Po Kun joined the insurrection in July 1948. U Nu's government deployed the Karen and Kachin Rifles to suppress the communist uprising, and took Pyay, Thayetmyo and Pyinmana during the latter half of 1948. The Karen National Union (KNU) rebelled at the end of January 1949 when Army Chief of Staff Smith Dun, an ethnic Karen, was replaced by Ne Win, a socialist commander and senior member of the Thirty Comrades after Aung San and Bo Let Ya. The Mon joined the Karen shortly afterwards, as did the Pa-O in Shan State. Three regiments of the Burma Rifles also went underground and formed the Revolutionary Burma Army (RBA), led by communist commanders Bo Zeya, Bo Yan Aung, and Bo Ye Htut, all members of the Thirty Comrades. The CPB had 4,000 to 15,000 armed troops and 25,000 party members in 1949.

The CPB's appraisal of Burma as a "semi-colonial and semi-feudal" state led to the Maoist line of establishing guerrilla bases among the peasants in the countryside as opposed to mobilising the urban proletariat, although it continued to support above-ground leftist opposition parties such as the Burma Workers and Peasants Party (BWPP) led by trade union leaders Thakins Lwin and Chit Maung, and dubbed "crypto-communists" or "red socialists" by the Rangoon press. They tried unsuccessfully to bring the communists back into mainstream politics, and in 1956 formed an alliance called the National United Front to contest the election on a "peace ticket" winning 35 per cent of the vote though only a small number of seats.

The politburo's decision to fight "for the very existence of our party" at a clandestine central committee meeting in April 1948 in Rangoon was confirmed the following month by the full plenum of the central committee at Hpyu 120 miles north of the capital. The headquarters of the CPB remained on the move mostly in the forests and hills along the Sittang River valley, Pyinmana – Yamethin area in central Burma, sometimes north into the "Three M triangle" (Mandalay–Meiktila–Myingyan). Debt was abolished, and farming and trading cooperatives established in areas under their control.

One year into the insurrection, the CPB's forces were reorganised along Maoist lines and divided into a main force, mobile guerrilla forces, and local people's militias, with the command of each being shared between military and political commissars. The main force was called the People's Liberation Army (PLA), homonymous with the People's Liberation Army of the People's Republic of China founded around the same time. In September 1950, the PLA merged with the RBA regiments under Bo Zeya's command and formed the People's Army (PA). Its regular forces consisted of four main divisions, each with a thousand armed troops.

Although its chairman Thakin Than Tun expressed support for the Karen people's right to self-determination, the CPB regarded the Karen National Union (KNU) as reactionaries employed by the British to destabilise Burma. The civil war was thus waged from three sides: the AFPFL, the communist PVOs and the ethnic minority nationalists with the KNU threatening Rangoon itself in early 1949. U Nu estimated government casualties alone at 3,424 dead, including 1,352 army personnel from 1950 to 1952. He also estimated that 22,000 civilians had been killed in the violence during the same period, but Western analysts argued it was an intentional underestimation and gave a much larger figure of 60,000 dead and 2 million displaced.

United fronts 
The first united front against the AFPFL, the People's Democratic Front (PDF), was established in Pyay in March 1949, after the town was captured by a joint CPB, RBA, and PVO force. The Tripartite Alliance Pact was the next, signed by Thakin Than Tun, Thakin Soe, and Bo Po Kun at the village of Alaungdaw Kathapa near Monywa on 1 October 1952. Apart from the CPB-RBA merger of September 1950 which formed the People's Army, the agreements mainly involved demarcation of territory and terms of cooperation.

In November 1952 a ceasefire agreement was reached between the CPB and the KNU, but a military alliance did not materialise until May 1959 in the form of the National Democratic United Front (NDUF). The surrender of smaller ethnic insurgent groups hastened the creation of the Democratic Nationalities United Front (DNUF), established in April 1956 by the KNU, which by then had become dominated by the Maoist Karen National United Party (KNUP) led by Mahn Ba Zan. The leftist turn of the KNU left it isolated from other ethnic insurgent groups, and it moved closer to the CPB despite the many staunch anti-communists in the veteran Christian leadership.

The NDUF also included the fledgling New Mon State Party (NMSP) led by Nai Shwe Kyin and formed after the surrender of the Mon People's Front (MPF), the Chin National Vanguard Party (CNVP) formed in March 1956, and the Karenni National Progressive Party (KNPP) led by Saw Maw Reh and formed in July 1957. Both the NMSP and the KNPP were founded with the help of the KNU. It was the most successful united front among the ethnic insurgent groups and lasted until 1976, when the KNU broke away from the NDUF to form the National Democratic Front (NDF).

However, political differences remained unresolved as no compromise was possible between the CPB's position of regional autonomy for Burma's ethnic minorities within a unitary state (modelled after the autonomous regions of China) and the ethnic minorities' demands for self-determination. Thakin Soe's red flag communists, meanwhile, advocated the establishment of "independent people's republics" for each ethnic group within a federal union (modelled after the Soviet Union), and more importantly, the right for each ethnic group to secede from such a union. During the 1950s and 1960s, Thakin Soe and his red flag communists succeeded in creating amicable relations with various ethnic minority communities in the border regions of Burma, leading to the establishment of such groups as the Communist Party of Arakan and the Karen New Land Party. However, the red flags' numbers were relatively low in comparison to the CPB's, and by the early 1970s most of the red flags' cadres had been crushed by other ethnic insurgent groups such as the KNU.

"Peace and unity" vs. "arms for democracy" 
The communist military offensive began to lose traction in the early 1950s; Burmese authorities outlawed the party in October 1953, and the CPB put forward the "peace and unity" proposal in 1955. It combined a strong peace movement by its above-ground supporters and sympathizers and proposals by Thakin Than Tun to the AFPFL government in 1956. War-weariness had led to a desire for peace, and the move was welcomed by both the leftist opposition and conservative groups in Rangoon. Thakin Kodaw Hmaing, the revered veteran nationalist leader, formed an Internal Peace Committee which in 1958 was allowed by the government to speak on the CPB's behalf. The results of the 1956 election, where the National United Front did very well on a peace ticket, had also given the AFPFL a jolt.

On the international front, U.S. support of the Kuomintang (KMT) forces, that had crossed over from Yunnan province into northeastern Burma after Mao's victory in China, had resulted in Burma's refusal to join the Southeast Asia Treaty Organisation (SEATO). Zhou Enlai visited Rangoon on his return from the Geneva Conference on Indo-China to meet U Nu, and issued a joint communique reaffirming the "five principles of peaceful coexistence" and the right of people "to choose their own state system"; U Nu repaid the visit the same year receiving the assurance that Chinese leaders had no contact with the CPB. Ne Win also led a military delegation to Beijing in 1957, and met Chairman Mao Zedong. A week-long visit in December 1955 by Nikolai Bulganin and Nikita Khrushchev appeared to endorse Burma as a model non-aligned, socialist Third World country developing at its own pace; Burma was a strong supporter of the 1955 Bandung Conference. Joseph Stalin's death and the shift in Soviet policy under Khrushchev contributed to the mood of national reconciliation.

U Nu then turned the communist peace offensive to his advantage and came up with a very successful "arms for democracy" offer. Tatmadaw (Burma Armed Forces) offensives in early 1956, Operation Aung Thura ("Valiant Victory") in Pakokku area and Operation Aung Tayza ("Glorious Victory") in Pathein area, had been partly successful. The year 1958 saw mass surrenders of first the Arakanese nationalists led by U Seinda, next the Pa-O, Mon, and Shan communists, but most importantly the PVO led by Bo Po Kun. The official figure was 5,500 armed insurgents that "entered the light", of which about 800 were white flag communists mainly in Sittwe, northern Rakhine State. The one crucial exception was the KNU.

1962 coup d'état and peace parley 
Ne Win's caretaker government presided over a general election in February 1960 which saw the return of U Nu to office after his faction of the Clean AFPFL, renamed the Union Party, won a landslide majority over the Stable AFPFL. Parliamentary democracy this time, however, lasted just two years before Ne Win staged a coup d'état on 2 March 1962. A major crackdown on the above-ground opposition followed, with most of the remaining leaders of the AFPFL and ethnic community leaders being rounded up and imprisoned. A peaceful student-led protest at Rangoon University on 7 July 1962 was brutally suppressed by the Tatmadaw, ending in a massacre of over 300 students by the students' accounts.

In the mid-1960s the United States State Department estimated the CPB's membership to be approximately 5,000.

1963 peace talks 

As head of the Union Revolutionary Council (URC) government, Ne Win launched a peace offensive starting with a general amnesty on 1 April 1963. Bo Ye Htut, a member of the Thirty Comrades and the central military committee of the CPB who had been to Rangoon on a secret peace mission before the 1958 AFPFL split, took the offer together with Bo Ye Maung and Bo Sein Tin. The KNU split in the same month between the Karen National Unity Party (KNUP) and the Karen Revolutionary Council (KRC) led by Saw Hunter Tha Hmwe. The red flag communists' delegation was the first to arrive in Rangoon in June, later joined by the red flag leader Thakin Soe himself from Arakan in August. After just three meetings the talks were abruptly ended by the URC on 20 August and the red flag communists were flown back to the Arakanese capital Sittwe.

Three CPB teams led by Bo Zeya, Yebaw Aung Gyi, Thakins Pu, and Ba Thein Tin arrived in July and September by air from China. These "Beijing returnees" were allowed to travel to the party's jungle headquarters in the Pegu Yoma near Paukkaung, where the leadership, reunited after 15 years, held a historic meeting of the central committee. Talks began on 2 September after the CPB delegation headed by the general secretary Yebaw Htay and the People's Army's chief of staff Bo Zeya arrived on 28 August. A second team headed by Thakin Zin, politburo member and secretary of the NDUF which agreed to negotiate as one team, arrived on 20 September. Meetings with the CPB and NDUF overshadowed those with other nationalities such as the Shan and Kachin delegations.

Talks broke down on 14 November, when the URC presented the CPB with the following demands:
 All troops must be concentrated in a designated area.
 No one can leave without permission.
 All organisational work must stop.
 All fundraising must stop.

Expectations had been running high, and the People's Peace Committee, set up by the NUF and supported by Thakin Kodaw Hmaing and former brigadier Kyaw Zaw, staged a Six-District Peace March in early November from Minhla to Rangoon. The marchers were cheered and applauded along the entire route by large crowds chanting anti-government slogans, and given food parcels collected by the Rangoon University Students Union (RUSU) and the All Burma Federation of Student Unions (ABFSU). When they reached Rangoon at a mass rally of 200,000 in front of city hall, speakers openly supported the NDUF's demand to keep its weapons and territory. Although at first the CPB and NDUF had misinterpreted Ne Win's peace offensive as a sign of weakness desperate for a solution, once they arrived in Rangoon they realised it was going to be a mainly cosmetic exercise. They therefore took the opportunity to re-establish contacts and meet family and friends.

Over 900 people, mostly BWPP and NUF activists, were arrested in the immediate aftermath. Thaton Hla Pe, leader of the Union Pa-O National Organisation (UPNO), former leader of the Pa-O National Organisation (PNO), and one of the main organisers of the peace march, was among the arrested, as was Nai Non Lar, the former leader of the Mon People's Front (MPF). By the end of the year over 2,000 were believed to have been imprisoned. Almost the entire executive committees of the RUSU and the ABFSU fled to join the CPB.

The CPB's "Cultural Revolution" (1964–1968) 
Frustrated with the failure of the 1963 peace talks and inspired by Cultural Revolution in China, Thakin Than Tun ordered the party to begin its own "Cultural Revolution". The party abandoned its previous position of "peace and unity" and returned to a revolutionary Maoist line. A mass campaign of purges and summary executions immediately followed, characterised by the Rangoon press as a policy of "purge, dismiss, and eliminate". Much of the party's old guard, as well as several student leaders who had joined the CPB after the failed 1963 peace talks, were killed under the orders of Thakin Than Tun.

Internal ideological struggles 
The CPB's leadership conducted a review of its "peace and unity" line in 1964. They did so for several reasons, including the failure of the 1963 peace talks, the government's intensification of its campaign of political repression and military offensives, and most importantly Ne Win's founding of the Burma Socialist Programme Party (BSPP) with the help of former communists. The CPB's willingness to carry out an armed struggle was the main difference between it and the above-ground leftist opposition parties such as the BWPP and NUF. Thakin Ba Tin, Yèbaw Htay, and Bo Yan Aung led the minority faction that questioned the need to continue the armed struggle, while Thakin Than Tun, Thakin Zin, Thakin Chit, and Bo Zeya formed the majority faction which argued for a return to a Maoist revolutionary line. The majority faction was reinforced by the Beijing returnees led by Yèbaw Aung Gyi, a former Rangoon University Student Union (RUSU) leader whose detailed analysis of the party's history up until that point was adopted as the "1964 line" at a central committee meeting near Nattalin, Bago Region, from 9 September to 14 October 1964. The 1964 line maintained that the CPB upheld a development of Marxism–Leninism which was independent from that of other countries and based on the concrete situation in Burma.

At this important meeting, which 11 out of the 20 central committee members were able to attend, a unanimous agreement was reached by the attendees to reaffirm Burma's status as "semi-colonial" after her "pseudo-independence" from the United Kingdom, and the primacy of the armed struggle against Ne Win's "armed counter-revolution". The party would establish a broad united front between the country's ethnic minorities and peasants, with the key task being party building.

Relations with China and the CCP 
The CPB sided with the Chinese Communist Party (CCP) from the onset of the Sino-Soviet split, rejecting the 1955 "revisionist" line of the Communist Party of the Soviet Union (CPSU). On the 50th anniversary of the Bolshevik Revolution, the CPB denounced the CPSU for supporting Ne Win's "pseudo-socialism".

Burma's insurgent groups, communist and ethnonationalist alike, became increasingly receptive of the Maoist concept of a "people's war". The CPB began identifying so closely with the CCP that it became the CCP's most important ally among the communist parties in the region, more so after the start of China's Cultural Revolution, which the CPB replicated. The CPB's Cultural Revolution was perceived by many Burmese as an attempt by China to intrude into Burmese affairs, a sentiment which led to the violent 1967 anti-Chinese riots in Burma. By the time the riots were quelled, 31 Chinese civilians had been killed and several Chinese-owned businesses had been burned down.

Recommitting itself to Mao Zedong Thought, in 1965 the CPB began constructing rural bases called "Red Power areas", managed by "hardcore" activists who would encircle the cities from the countryside and eventually launch a "final seizure of power" when conditions permitted. A central party school for political training in Mao Zedong Thought was established and its first course was taught on 25 March 1965. These efforts by the CPB were openly supported by the CCP, which provided the CPB with arms and funding during the 1960s and 1970s.

However, growing dissension within the party prompted Thakin Than Tun, Thakin Chit, and the Beijing returnees to meet on 16 August 1966 to decide on a strategy to remedy this "issue". Drawing on the practices of China's Red Guards, they established youth teams and handpicked the university and high school students who would lead the party's majority faction in purging their opponents.

Purges 
Several senior party officials were labelled "revisionists" and purged during the CPB's Cultural Revolution. Thakin Ba Tin and Yèbaw Htay were suspended from the politburo on 27 April 1967, while a number of other senior members, such as Yèbaw Ba Khet, left the party, sensing the impending danger. Thakin Ba Tin was summarily tried and executed on 18 June 1967, followed by Yèbaw Htay, whose own son formed part of the execution squad. They were dubbed "Burma's Deng Xiaoping and Liu Shaochi", respectively. Thakin Than Tun and the remaining politburo passed a resolution on 15 December 1967 to adopt the "intraparty revolutionary line" and ordered party cadres across the country to carry out their own purges. Bo Yan Aung, who accompanied Aung San to Xiamen in search of military training abroad and was the first of the Thirty Comrades, was the next major victim of the purges on 26 December 1967. In August 1968, Bo Tun Nyein, who had led the executions of Thakin Ba Tin, Yèbaw Htay and Bo Yan Aung, was himself executed after being charged with "trying to set up a rival party headquarters". Former leaders of the RUSU, such as Aung Thein Naing (nephew of Bo Yan Aung) and Soe Win (son of Ludu U Hla and Ludu Daw Amar), met the same fate the next month.

Aftermath of the purges 
Ne Win's government took advantage of the chaos and confusion within the CPB and launched a massive military offensive against the party in 1968, which resulted in the deaths of several more senior CPB officials. Bo Zeya, by that time the chief of staff of the People's Army, was killed in action on 16 April 1968, in a battle on the city borders of Pyay and Tharrawaddy. Yèbaw Tun Maung (Dr. Nath), the other Bengali founding member of the CPB besides Yèbaw Htay, was killed in action later the same year, near Hpyu in the Bago Yoma. On 24 September 1968, while on the run from government troops, Thakin Than Tun was shot dead by one of his own bodyguards, who later surrendered to Ne Win's government. The assassin had joined the CPB just two years prior as an "army deserter".

The CPB's former base in the Pegu Yoma mountain range, in central Burma, was eventually destroyed in 1975 after heavy clashes between the CPB and Tatmadaw. Despite these setbacks, the CPB had approximately 10,000 to 14,000 troops during the 1970s.

1980–1981 peace parley 
Shortly after Burma resigned from the Non-Aligned Movement in protest against Soviet and Vietnamese "manipulation" at the September 1979 Havana Conference, the Chinese Foreign Minister Huang Hua paid a visit to Rangoon. Ne Win announced an amnesty in 1980 which saw the return of U Nu and others from Thailand. The CPB responded with an attack on Mong Yawng, but proposed talks in September after letting the amnesty expire. The first meeting took place in Beijing in October between the teams led by Ba Thein Tin and Ne Win who paid a surprise visit to China leaving the Kachin delegation in the middle of the talks in Rangoon. At the second meeting headed by Thakin Pe Tint of the CPB and Maj. Gen. Aye Ko of the BSPP the following May in Lashio, three new conditions were put on the table by Aye Ko:

 The abolition of the CPB.
 The abolition of the People's Army under the command of the CPB.
 The abolition of all the "liberated areas".

The CPB was told that according to Article 11 of the 1974 Constitution which had established Burma as a one-party state there was no place for another political party. Ne Win ended the peace talks on 14 May and let the ceasefire deadline of 31 May with the KIO pass without replying to the Kachin position. There had been no ceasefire agreement with the CPB.

Across the border in China, the CPB-sympathetic "Voice of the People of Burma" (VOPB) began to broadcast appeals for ending the insurgency in Burma, developing democracy in the country and building national unity in a new multi-party system. The CPB still commanded 15,000 troops in the northeast, and the Tatmadaw, after resuming the Operation King Conqueror belatedly in 1982 and having suffered losses amounting to several hundred in the Kengtung-Tangyang area from CPB counter-attacks, finally retreated. Both sides now faced another challenge in the rising strength of the NDF formed in 1976, pointedly excluding the Bamar, by the ethnic insurgencies uniting the Karen, Mon, Kachin, Shan, Pa-O, Karenni, Kayan, Wa and Lahu, particularly with the return of the KIO in 1983 after its separate peace talks with the BSPP failed. This finally led to the CPB reaching an agreement with the NDF in 1986.

1985 rectification 

In November 1978 Thakin Ba Thein Tin presented a "political report" at a historic meeting of the politburo held in Pangsang, unanimously approved at the central committee meeting in early 1979. It formed the basis of the resolutions passed in September 1985 at the CPB's third congress, 40 years since the last one in Rangoon, attended by just 170 of the party's estimated 5,000 members.
 The party's past errors of the 1955 "revisionist" line and the 1964 "intra-party revolutionary line" were now admitted.
 Ne Win's regime was characterised as representing "imperialism, feudal-landlordism and bureaucratic capitalism".
 The primacy of the armed struggle, Marxist–Leninist–Mao Zedong Thought and China's example was reaffirmed.
 Soviet "socialism-imperialism" and Vietnam's "hegemonism" were to be resisted as much as "US imperialism". The CPB had supported the Khmer Rouge and written to both the Vietnamese and Cambodian parties urging them to settle their dispute peacefully. Ne Win, for his part in playing the China card, also happened to be the first head of state to pay a visit to Phnom Penh after the Khmer Rouge came to power.

The party's general programme was drawn up in the light of "the experiences of the last 30 years of the armed struggle".
 It warned against "sectarianism" and "leftist" and "rightist deviationism".
 The party's constitution was revised to "suit the changing conditions" of the world.
 New "party building", "military" and "agricultural" lines were adopted.
 Party membership had failed to fulfill the 1964 directive of recruiting at least one member from every village.
 The new military line would be "strategic defence" at a time when the party was weak and the enemy strong.
 Because Burma was still a "backward semi-colonial, semi-feudal, agrarian country with uneven political and economic development", "agrarian revolution" with the slogan "land to the tillers" was still the basis of a "people's war" waged by building up Red Power areas and encircling the cities. In insisting on not "copying the October Revolution of Russia" by calling a "general strike and uprising" (in Burmese), it appeared to have ignored the recent upheavals of 1974–1976 in the cities.

8888 Uprising 

By 1987 the isolationist policies of Ne Win's "Burmese Way to Socialism" had decimated Burma's economy, and the United Nations designated the country as one of the world's least developed. Simmering discontent amongst the Burmese populace over the years was compounded by yet another round of demonetisation in late 1987. Protests and marches against the government began earnestly on 12 March 1988 and culminated in a nationwide uprising on 8 August 1988. The protesters succeeded in pressuring Ne Win and most BSPP officials to resign from their offices, but the Tatmadaw, after accusing the protesters of being communist agitators, seized power in a coup d'état on 18 September 1988 and violently suppressed the demonstrations.

CPB politburo member Kyin Maung was forthright in admitting the presence of party cadres in the cities during demonstrations, but he asserted that the Military Intelligence Service (MIS) had greatly exaggerated the party's role in the uprising. The CPB had begun advocating a multiparty system after 1981, and on 28 March 1988 it called for a provisional government composed of various opposition groups and figures. The students' calls for the military to create an interim government and to hold multiparty elections fell on deaf ears, and the failure of U Nu and Aung San Suu Kyi to achieve a united opposition sealed the fate of the uprising.

During the uprising, communists and moderate leftists were active organisers and supporters of the democracy movement and strike committees in the cities. Kyin Maung stated, "We had never said that we initiated the upheavals. Nor did we say that our cadres comprised the leading core. On the contrary, we firmly believe that the upheavals had so much impact only because all the forces for democracy took part. Marxism holds that it is the people who make history." Neither the CPB nor the NDF took advantage of the crisis that the government found itself in, as the former was evidently unprepared for an urban uprising as opposed to a peasant war, and many ethnic armed groups regarded the uprising as an internal Bamar issue.

1989 mutiny 
On 16 April 1989, a group of mutineers stormed the party headquarters in Pangsang and destroyed portraits of communist leaders and copies of communist literature. Many party members, including the senior leadership, were forced into exile and fled across the border into China. The party's ethnic Wa leaders in Pangsang later formed the United Wa State Army, while splinter groups led by Pheung Kya-shin and Sai Leun broke away and formed the Myanmar National Democratic Alliance Army and National Democratic Alliance Army, respectively.

2021 reemergence 

On the morning of 1 February 2021, the Tatmadaw deposed the democratically elected members of Myanmar's civilian government in a military coup d'état. The CPB subsequently released a statement on the same day, condemning the coup and calling for a united front against the Tatmadaw.

CPB cadres reentered Myanmar through the China–Myanmar border in March 2021. Five months later in August 2021, the CPB announced that it had rearmed itself and established a new armed wing, the People's Liberation Army (PLA), to wage a "people's war" against the State Administration Council (SAC). The Kachin Independence Army (KIA) provided the PLA's initial supply of weapons and equipment.

Election results

Notes

References

Citations

Sources

Books

Journal articles

News articles

Other

External links 
  of the Communist Party of Burma 
  

1939 establishments in Burma
Banned communist parties
Burma in World War II
Communist militant groups
Communist parties in Myanmar
Guerrilla organizations
Maoism in Asia
Maoist parties
Paramilitary organisations based in Myanmar
Political parties established in 1939
Political parties in Myanmar
Rebel groups in Myanmar